Hickford is a surname. Notable people with the surname include:

Frederick Hickford (1862–1929), Australian politician
John Hickford, British dancemaster. Owned Hickford's Long Room 1713 — c.1779.
Michael Hickford (born 1953), British Anglican priest